Below is a list of covered bridges in Vermont.  There are just over 100 authentic covered bridges in the U.S. state of Vermont, giving the state the highest number of covered bridges per square mile in the United States. A covered bridge is considered authentic not due to its age, but by its construction. An authentic bridge is constructed using trusses rather than other methods such as stringers (a popular choice for non-authentic covered bridges).

List

Destroyed
 The Old Mead Covered Bridge in Pittsford was destroyed by fire on July 22, 1971.
 The Twigg-Smith Covered Bridge in West Windsor was destroyed by wind in 2002.
 The Frank Lewis Covered Bridge in Woodstock was destroyed by Hurricane Irene on August 28, 2011.
 The Cedar Swamp Covered Bridge in Cornwall was destroyed by fire on September 10, 2016.
 The River Road Covered Bridge in Troy was destroyed by a snowmobile fire on February 6, 2021.

See also

 List of non-authentic Covered Bridges in Vermont
 List of bridges on the National Register of Historic Places in Vermont
 List of Vermont-related topics

Notes

References

External links

Covered bridges at Virtual Vermont
Covered Bridges of Pittsford, VT

Bridges, covered
 
Vermont, covered
Bridges, covered